The Punjab women's cricket team is an Indian domestic cricket team representing the Indian state of Punjab. The team has represented the state in Women's Senior One Day Trophy (List A) and Senior women's T20 league.

Punjab women's cricket team won their first ever senior T20 title for the domestic season 2018-19 by remaining unbeaten throughout the league matches held at Agartala and super league matches held at Mumbai under the captaincy of Parveen Khan and the guidance of coach Ashutosh Sharma.

Inspired by a disciplined bowling attack, Punjab emerged victorious over Karnataka by four runs and clinched their first ever Senior women's T20 league title at Wankhede Stadium, Mumbai.

Batting was tremendously done by Jasia Akhtar who scored 56 runs in 54 balls, Neelam Bisht scored 27, Amarpal Kaur scored 13, Taniya Bhatia scored 12 adding up to a total of 131 runs for 7 wickets in 20 overs.

In return Karnataka also lead a blazing start with openers Vellaswamy Vanitha and S Shubha scoring 19 runs in 2.5 overs. Once the openers were back to the pavilion then the task to chase the target was taken ahead by G Divya and C Pratyusha who scored 41 and 35 respectively.

However it was in the last over bowled by the Neelam Bisht which won the battle for Punjab. The bowler managed to take two crucial wickets in last over and turned the match into Punjab's favour.

Bowlers Komalpreet Kaur and Sunita who took 2 wickets by giving 24 runs and 19 runs respectively and BN Meena accounted for 1 wicket.

Mohali RP Singla, Secretary (Now, former) Punjab Cricket Association lauded the efforts of Punjab team that beat Karnataka in the final match to clinch the maiden title during BCCI Senior Women's T20 League Tournament.

He congratulated Punjab team captain Parveen Khan and team members and their splendid display throughout the tournament. The success of the tournament can also be attributed to Punjab coach Ashutosh Sharma, who had replaced R P Singh this season.

When Commentator and former Indian cricketer Anjum Chopra asked the team captain Parveen Khan about the reason behind the success, then she praised the coach Ashutosh Sharma for his contribution and encouragement. She said, "Ashu Sir was like a wall behind the team.His constant guidance and motivational attitude helped us reach the final. Even on off days,he conducted the team meetings and made sure we never lost the will to win the title. The girls responded well to the challenge and we manage to lay hands on the trophy."

 Punjab beat J & K by 9 wickets. 
 Punjab beat Goa by 27 runs. 
 Punjab beat Hyderabad by 23 runs. 
 Punjab beat Tripura by one over eliminator. 
 Punjab beat Uttarakhand by 52 runs. 
 Punjab beat Railways by 4 wickets.  
 Punjab beat Madhya Pradesh by 8 runs. 
 Punjab beat Delhi by 2 wickets.  
 Punjab beat Maharashtra by 7 wickets. 
 Punjab beat Karnataka by 4 runs.

Notable players
Harmanpreet Kaur

Current squad
Ridhima Aggarwal
Amanjot Kaur
Taniya Bhatia (wk)
Neetu Singh
Harmanpreet Kaur (C)
Parveen Khan
Kanika Ahuja
Neelam Bisht
Gazala Naj
Babita Meena
Mehak Kesar
Komalpreet Kour
Harpreet Dhillon

Honours
 Women's Senior T20 Trophy:
 Winners (1): 2018–19

References
https://web.archive.org/web/20170608164900/http://paper.hindustantimes.com/epaper/iphone/homepage.aspx#_articlefd4d3db4-c083-4646-b3c0-64622f1958c2/waarticlefd4d3db4-c083-4646-b3c0-64622f1958c2/fd4d3db4-c083-4646-b3c0-64622f1958c2//true

Women's cricket teams in India
Cricket in Punjab, India